The Ohio Cup, also known as the Battle of Ohio, is an annual interleague rivalry series between the two Major League Baseball (MLB) teams from the U.S. state of Ohio: the Cincinnati Reds of the National League (NL) and the Cleveland Guardians (formerly Indians) of the American League (AL). The series name comes from the trophy the teams play for, which was first introduced in 1989 for an annual pre-season exhibition game between the two teams, and later reintroduced in 2008. The cup is awarded to the team that wins the most games against the other in a particular season. In the event of a tie, the team holding the trophy from the previous season retains it.

Prior to the introduction of interleague play, the current Cincinnati and Cleveland franchises had only met in spring training or other exhibition games. Because the two teams play in opposite leagues, the only chance they can meet in the postseason is in the World Series. The Ohio Cup series was originally created in 1989 and was an exhibition game between the two teams played in the state capital of Columbus at Cooper Stadium just prior to the start of the season. A total of eight Ohio Cup games were played, from 1989 to 1996, with the Indians winning six. The games in Columbus were typically well-attended, with attendance topping the stadium's 15,000-seat capacity in all but one year.

The regular-season series began in 1997 with the start of interleague play and has been played every season since except 2002. From 1999 to 2001 and until 2012, the teams met in two three-game series per season, one in Cincinnati and one in Cleveland. Since 2013, two two-game series are played at each team's home field most years. In the years the AL Central plays the NL Central as part of the interleague play rotation, the teams usually meet in two three-game series though not in 2020 despite the schedule changed to AL vs NL Central. Through the 2022 meetings, the Guardians lead the regular-season series 71-56. The Guardians currently hold the trophy, and have done so since the 2015 season by virtue of either series wins or retention via tie.

History
Cincinnati and Cleveland both have long histories in professional baseball and the current Cincinnati Reds and Cleveland Guardians franchises are among the oldest in Major League Baseball. The original Cincinnati Red Stockings, founded in 1869, were the first professional baseball team, and they were soon followed by other professional teams, including one in Cleveland known as Forest City, founded that same year. The two teams played in Cleveland on July 2, 1869, a 25–6 win for the Red Stockings. The two cities competed directly again during the 1879 season as members of the National League. An earlier Reds franchise, a charter member of the NL, met the Cleveland Blues twelve times that year, with the Reds winning eight games and the Blues winning four. After that season, the Reds disbanded while the Blues continued until 1884.

The two cities resumed competition with each other in the latter years of the American Association after the current Cincinnati Reds franchise was founded in 1882 as a charter member of the AA, and the Cleveland Spiders, first known as the Blues or Forest Citys, formed in 1887. The first American Association meeting between Cleveland and Cincinnati was played at League Park in Cincinnati, a 16–6 win for the Red Stockings. During their two seasons together in the AA, Cincinnati won 21 games with Cleveland taking 13.

The teams met again two years later, as members of the National League, after Cleveland joined the NL in 1889 and Cincinnati in 1890. The game was played at National League Park in Cleveland, a 3–2 Spiders win. The following season, the Spiders hosted the Reds in the very first game played at League Park in Cleveland, won by the Spiders 12–3 behind winning pitcher Cy Young. The series continued until 1899, when the Spiders were one of four teams contracted by the NL at the end of the season. Over the 10 seasons both were part of the National League, the Reds and Spiders played 138 times, with Cincinnati winning 75, Cleveland 60, and three ties.

Modern era
The Spiders were replaced in Cleveland by a minor league team called the Lake Shores in the American League for the 1900 season. The AL declared itself a major league for the 1901 season with the Cleveland franchise, then called the Blues, as a charter member. The team was later called the Bronchos and Naps before being named the Indians in 1915 and Guardians in 2022. Because the two teams are part of different leagues, however, the only chance for them to meet prior to the introduction of Interleague Play in 1997 was in exhibition games or in the World Series. The Indians and Reds came close to meeting on three occasions, first when Cincinnati won the tainted 1919 World Series with the Indians  games back in the AL. The following season, the Indians won the World Series with the Reds third in the NL. In 1940, the Reds again won the World Series with the Indians finishing one game back in the American League.

Through 2021, the teams have only made the playoffs in the same season three times. The first time was in  when both teams won their respective division and advanced to their respective League Championship Series. Both teams, however, fell to the eventual champion Atlanta Braves as the Reds were lost the National League Championship Series and the Indians lost the World Series. Likewise, both teams were wild card entries in  but each lost in the first round.

Ohio Championship Series
In July 1910, the Cincinnati manager challenged the Cleveland Naps to a seven-game "Championship of Ohio" series, which was held after the conclusion of the regular season. The Reds won the opener in Cincinnati, 14–7, and ultimately won the series 4–3, with the home team winning all seven games. After the 1911 season, the series was held again, with the Reds winning 4–2. The opener of the 1911 series, however, only drew 580 fans in Cincinnati, and while the remaining games, all played at League Park in Cleveland, drew better, the series was discontinued.

First Ohio Cup

Details of the original Ohio Cup were unveiled at a press conference on August 25, 1988. At that time, the two teams occasionally played each other in spring training and had yet to make the post-season in the same season. The managers of both teams did not treat the cup game as anything more than an exhibition, but many fans in Columbus treated it like a referendum on major league sports in the city as, at that time, Columbus did not have any major sports franchises.

Sitting between Cleveland and Cincinnati, the city was always divided when it came to allegiance to the state's big league teams. "Half the fans (in Columbus) love the Reds and hate the Indians and the other half love the Indians and hate the Reds. It's a great matchup", said the game's promoter, Keith Sprunk. Indians manager Doc Edwards agreed. "I'll love to play it, it's great. San Francisco and Oakland do the same thing. I'd like to see (the Ohio Cup) become an annual thing, either during the spring or in the summer." Crowds averaged 15,910 fans for the first five Ohio Cups at the 15,000-seat Cooper Stadium. Those crowds ranked 3rd, 4th, 7th, 9th and 12th among all-time largest baseball crowds at the stadium.  Only about 2000 made it out in 1995 with temperatures near freezing and replacement players taking the field.

The first Ohio Cup match-up was marred by  temperatures made colder by constant rain and brisk wind. Cleveland started only four regulars while Cincinnati opted to play seven of their nine starters.  It remained scoreless until the top of the eighth inning when a throwing error by Reds outfielder Herm Winningham allowed Luis Aguayo to score the only run. Minor league pitcher Greg McMichael received the win while Reds' reliever Mike Griffin was credited with the loss.

In the  contest, catchers Sandy Alomar Jr. and Joel Skinner combined for six RBI as the Indians won their second straight Ohio Cup before a standing-room only crowd. In an action-packed game, the Indians banged out 13 hits, including six in the fourth inning which resulted in seven-runs. Cory Snyder hit a monster blast off Danny Jackson that traveled well past the 400-foot sign in straightaway center field. Alomar homered twice, the first a three-run shot to left-center, the second a solo effort. Skinner hit a two-run shot after being brought in to replace Alomar.

Jerry Browne hit a sacrifice fly in the seventh inning to lift the Indians to victory. Cincinnati took the lead in the first. Lead off hitter Bip Roberts doubled and later scored. They added another run in the fourth. Reds' third baseman Chris Sabo counted an RBI double among his two hits while Albert Belle hit two of his team's four hits.

Mike Bielecki stopped Cincinnati on one run and four hits in six innings and Albert Belle had a three-run single as the Tribe won their fourth Ohio Cup in five years in the  contest. Highlights included a home run by Indians' first baseman Paul Sorrento. The only Reds run was scored by Barry Larkin.

In , Manny Ramírez and Paul Sorrento homered in a five-run second inning to help give the Indians an 8–4 win. Mark Clark pitched seven innings, allowing five hits and three runs, walking one and striking out five to gain the win. Albert Belle and Eddie Murray led off the second inning with singles and Sorrento followed with his homer. After Jim Thome singled, Ramírez homered. All five runs came off Tom Browning.

With the 1994–95 Major League Baseball strike only coming to an end on April 2, replacement players traveled to Columbus to take part in the  edition. Teamsters picketed outside the stadium as snow fell.  With temperatures near freezing and replacements Tim Delgado and Rich Sauveur taking the mound, only a couple thousand fans made it out.  The Reds won the game 6–1.

Manny Ramírez had given Cleveland a 3–1 lead with a three-run homer to left field in the second off the Reds' Mark Portugal. Hal Morris drove in two runs for the Reds with a first-inning single and a double in the third, with Bret Boone scoring both times. A single by Vince Coleman in the fifth drove in Jeff Branson and tied the score at 3–3. The victory gave the Indians a 6–2 lead in the Ohio Cup series and was viewed by 16,697 people, the largest crowd in the game's history and the second largest at Cooper Stadium. Indians starter Joe Roa was the winning pitcher.

Interleague Series (1997–present)

In 1997 the Ohio Cup match series was discontinued with the introduction of interleague play and games between the Indians and the Reds continued as the "Battle of Ohio" series. The Indians and Reds first met on June 16, 1997 at Jacobs Field, in front of a sellout crowd of 42,961.  Cleveland starting pitcher Orel Hershiser struck out lead off hitter Deion Sanders.  Indians' designated hitter Kevin Seitzer recorded the first ever hit in a Battle for Ohio game when he doubled in the bottom of the first inning.  Pokey Reese recorded the series first ever run, scoring in the bottom of the second inning for the Reds.  Manny Ramírez hit the first Buckeye Series home run in the bottom of the ninth, but it was not enough to prevent the Reds winning the inaugural game 4–1.

Except in 2002, the Indians and Reds have played each other every year since interleague play has been established.  They have played each other 6 times every year from 1999 to 2012 except 2002 and 2003, with each team hosting a three-game series.  The Reds and Indians did not play each other in 2002 and played one three-game series in 2003. In 2004, the Indians-Reds rivalry resumed, playing six games per year.

Ohio Cup revived
The Ohio Cup was reintroduced in 2008 with a new trophy. The trophy is 3 feet high, with a 12-inch stainless cup in the middle. It is awarded to the team that wins the season series in a given year. When the teams split the season series, the team that currently holds the trophy retains it. Through the 2022 season, the Indians/Guardians have won the trophy six times, the Reds four times, with six ties.

In the revived trophy's inaugural season, the Reds swept the first three-game series at home, which took place May 16–18 , after three strong performances by Edinson Vólquez, Aaron Harang, and Johnny Cueto. As the series moved back to Cleveland on June 27–29, with the Indians' CC Sabathia throwing a 6–0 shutout against the Reds in the first game. In the second, the Reds battled back with a strong effort by Cueto to win game two 5–0. The Cincinnati Reds clinched the cup with this win. In the final game in Cleveland, the Reds overcame a late surge by the Tribe to win 9–5, and the series itself 5 games to 1. Ballots were passed out in the middle of the final game for the MVP, awarded to Reds outfielder Adam Dunn, who had a combined five home runs and 10 RBI in the series.

In , the Reds retained the trophy, winning four of the six contests.  The Reds took two of the three games in Cincinnati in May, and went on to win two of the three games in Cleveland in June.  In 2010, the Reds won the Ohio Cup again, winning 2 of 3 games in Cincinnati, and again winning 2 of 3 games in Cleveland. The Indians won the trophy in 2011 by sweeping the first series in Cleveland, and winning 2 of 3 in the Cincinnati series. The Indians retained the trophy In 2012 and 2013 as the two teams split the Ohio Cup series, with each team sweeping their respective home series.

Beginning in 2013, this rivalry, along with all other interleague rivalries, played four games per year in two back-to-back two game series, instead of six games as they played through 2012.  From 2013 to 2017 the two teams would play in one city on a Monday and Tuesday and the other city that Wednesday and Thursday. Since 2019, the teams now play the four games in separate two-game series due to changes in the MLB schedule. The teams played six games in separate three game series in 2015 and 2018, and are expected to do so in years in which the AL Central and NL Central are matched up against each other.

On May 7, 2021, Reds P Wade Miley threw the first and, to date, only no-hitter in the series, leading the Reds to a 3–0 win at Progressive Field.

Results summary
Note: All game scores are listed with the visiting score first

Spring training
The Guardians and Reds have played each other many times in spring training as part of the Grapefruit League and Cactus League as the two teams trained at various times in Florida and Arizona. Since 2010, the Guardians and Reds have shared Goodyear Ballpark in Goodyear, Arizona as their main spring training site. 

The teams cleared their benches during an exhibition in 1993, when José Mesa threw a pitch behind Cincinnati's Hal Morris leading to a fight in which Morris separated his shoulder when Mesa slammed him to the ground.

See also
 Major League Baseball rivalries
 Baseball awards#Awards given to specific teams
 Battle of Ohio (NFL)

References

External links
The Battle for Ohio at MLB.com

Major League Baseball rivalries
Major League Baseball trophies and awards
Cleveland Guardians
Cincinnati Reds
Baseball in Ohio
Interleague play
2008 establishments in Ohio
Recurring sporting events established in 2008
Awards established in 2008
Annual events in Major League Baseball